Hypoptopoma machadoi is a species of catfish of the family Loricariidae.

This catfish reaches a maximum length of  SL. It is demersal, being found in fresh water in the tropics.
 
Hypoptopoma machadoi is native to South America, and is known to occur in the Rio Orinoco basin in Venezuela, including the Rio Meta drainage in Colombia.

The fish is named in honor of Antonio Machado-Allison (b. 1945) of the Universidad Central de Venezuela, because of his lifelong dedication and contributions to neotropical ichthyology.

Interactions with humans
Hypoptopoma machadoi is harmless to humans.

References

Aquino, A.E. and S.A. Schaefer, 2010. Systematics of the genus Hypoptopoma Günther, 1868 (Siluriformes, Loricariidae). Bull. Amer. Mus. Nat. Hist. 336:1-110. 

Hypoptopomatini
Catfish of South America
Fish of Venezuela
Fish of Colombia
Taxa named by Adriana Elbia Aquino
Taxa named by Scott Allen Schaefer
Fish described in 2010